Pristimantis angustilineatus is a species of frog in the family Strabomantidae. It is endemic to Colombia and known from the Cordillera Occidental in Chocó, Risaralda, and Valle del Cauca Departments, at elevations of  asl. The specific name angustilineatus refers to the narrow white dorsolateral lines and comes from Latin angustus (="narrow") and lineatus (="of a line").

Description
Head is broader than body and longer than wide. Skin of dorsum is smooth, without folds; skin of venter is areolate. The body is yellow or yellowish-green above with some brown flecking dorsally (some individuals are nearly red above). Dorsolateral stripe is yellow and bordered below by brown to nearly black. Vocal sac is pale yellow. Parietal peritoneum is metallic white. Upper eyelid is pale green and iris is reddish-brown or copper with black reticulation.

Habitat and conservation
Pristimantis angustilineatus lives in cloud forests, occurring on low herbaceous vegetation or on epiphytic vegetation. It is a locally common species but threatened by habitat loss caused by expanding agricultural activities.

References

angustilineatus
Amphibians of the Andes
Amphibians of Colombia
Endemic fauna of Colombia
Amphibians described in 1998
Taxa named by John Douglas Lynch
Taxonomy articles created by Polbot